Darkness, Darkness may refer to:

"Darkness, Darkness", a 1969 song by Jesse Colin Young
Darkness, Darkness (album), a 1972 album by Phil Upchurch
Darkness Darkness, a 1980 album by Eric Burdon

See also 
 Darkness (disambiguation)